Cándida Montilla de Medina is a Dominican clinical psychologist. The wife of former president, Danilo Medina. Montilla de Medina served as the First Lady of the Dominican Republic from 2012 to 2020.

Biography

Education and personal life
Montilla de Medina was born on 3 October 1962 in Santo Domingo, where she has resided for most of her life. She graduated from Universidad Católica de Santo Domingo and became a clinical psychologist, specializing in family therapy. She also studied human resource management at the Beck Institute for Cognitive Behavior Therapy in suburban Philadelphia, Pennsylvania. She had conducted studies and seminars within her fields, including at the INCAE Business School in Costa Rica.

Montilla married her husband, Danilo Medina, in 1987. They have three daughters: Candy Sibely, Vanessa Daniela and Ana Paula.

Career
From 2004 until August 2012, Cándida Montilla de Medina served as the founder and founding director of the Department of Human Development and Family Integration (PDHIF) at the Central Bank of the Dominican Republic. She left that position to become the country's First Lady in August 2012.

Montilla de Medina actively campaigned on behalf of her husband during the 2012 Dominican Republic presidential election. She chaired a group called "Mujeres Creciendo con Danilo" (Women Growing with Danilo), to focus on women voters to Medina's candidacy and the Dominican Liberation Party (PLD).
Cándida Montilla de Medina assumed the role of First Lady of the Dominican Republic on August 16, 2012, when Danilo Medina assumed the presidency. She focused on healthcare and social issues, including care for children and the elderly, education, and women's affairs during her tenure.

References

Living people
First ladies of the Dominican Republic
Dominican Republic psychologists
People from Santo Domingo
Dominican Republic women psychologists
1962 births